William John McGregor "Greg" Tegart  is a former senior Australian public servant. He is currently an adjunct professor at Victoria University.

Early life
Greg Tegart was born on 27 March 1929. He was educated at the Royal Melbourne Institute of Technology, University of Melbourne and University of Sheffield.

Career
Tegart first joined the Australian Public Service in 1947 as Laboratory Assistant and Technical Officer with the Commonwealth Scientific and Industrial Research Organisation.

He was appointed Secretary of the Department of Science and Technology in 1981.

Tegart retired from the public service in 1993.

Awards and honours
In June 1990, Tegart was made a Member of the Order of Australia in recognition of service to science and technology.

Tegart is a Foundation Fellow of the Australian Academy of Technological Sciences and Engineering.

References

1929 births
Living people
Australian public servants
Fellows of the Australian Academy of Technological Sciences and Engineering
Members of the Order of Australia